The Press Freedom Index is an annual ranking of countries compiled and published by Reporters Without Borders since 2002 based upon the organisation's own assessment of the countries' press freedom records in the previous year. It intends to reflect the degree of freedom that journalists, news organisations, and netizens have in each country, and the efforts made by authorities to respect this freedom. Reporters Without Borders is careful to note that the index only deals with press freedom and does not measure the quality of journalism in the countries it assesses, nor does it look at human rights violations in general.

Methodology 
The report is partly based on a questionnaire using seven general criteria: pluralism (measures the degree of representation of opinions in the media space), media independence, environment and self-censorship, legislative framework, transparency, infrastructure, and abuses. The questionnaire takes account of the legal framework for the media (including penalties for press offences, the existence of a state monopoly for certain kinds of media and how the media are regulated) and the level of independence of the public media. It also includes violations of the free flow of information on the Internet. 

Violence against journalists, netizens, and media assistants, including abuses attributable to the state, armed militias, clandestine organisations or pressure groups, are monitored by RSF staff during the year and are also part of the final score. A smaller score on the report corresponds to greater freedom of the press as reported by the organisation. The questionnaire is sent to Reporters Without Borders's partner organisations: 18 freedom of expression non-governmental organisations located in five continents, its 150 correspondents around the world and journalists, researchers, jurists and human rights activists.

Rankings and scores by country

See also 

 Censorship by country
 Internet censorship and surveillance by country
 List of freedom indices

References

External links
 Full list of rankings from the Press Freedom Index
 About the World Press Freedom Index

International rankings
 
Freedom of the press
Journalism lists